Lloyd Patrick Allen   (August 26, 1961 – June 22, 2021) was an American professional football player who was a cornerback in the National Football League (NFL).

Born in Seattle, Washington, Allen graduated from Utah State University, where he starred as a cornerback. He played seven seasons in the NFL, all with the Houston Oilers.

Allen was found dead in his Seattle apartment on June 22, 2021. He was aged 59.

References

External links
 NFL.com player page

1961 births
2021 deaths
Players of American football from Seattle
American football cornerbacks
Utah State Aggies football players
Houston Oilers players